Leucania inconspicua is a moth of the family Noctuidae first described by Gottlieb August Wilhelm Herrich-Schäffer in 1868. It is found in Florida, Cuba, Puerto Rico, Jamaica, the Lesser Antilles and from Mexico to Brazil.

References

Moths described in 1868
Leucania